The 1944 United States presidential election in Nebraska took place on November 7, 1944, as part of the 1944 United States presidential election. Voters chose six representatives, or electors, to the Electoral College, who voted for president and vice president.

Nebraska was won by Governor Thomas E. Dewey (R–New York), running with Governor John Bricker, with 58.58% of the popular vote, against incumbent President Franklin D. Roosevelt (D–New York), running with Senator Harry S. Truman, with 41.42% of the popular vote.

With 58.58% of the popular vote, Nebraska would prove to be Dewey's second strongest state after Kansas.

Results

Results by county

See also
 United States presidential elections in Nebraska

References

Nebraska
1944
1944 Nebraska elections